The Decentralized Administration of Epirus and Western Macedonia is one of the seven decentralized administrations of Greece, consisting of the peripheries of Epirus and Western Macedonia. Seated in Ioannina, Epirus, it is currently led by Acting Secretary-General Vasileios Michelakis.

Formation and tasks

Decentralized Administrations were created in January 2011 as part of a far-reaching reform of the country's administrative structure, the Kallikratis reform (Law 3852/2010).

They enjoy both administrative and financial autonomy and exercise devolved state powers in urban planning, environmental and energy policy, forestry, migration and citizenship. Beyond that, they are tasked with supervising the first and second-level self-governing bodies: the municipalities and regions, in this case the 30 municipalities of Epirus and Western Macedonia, and the two regions themselves.

Characteristics
Covering an area of  Epirus and Western Macedonia is medium-sized by area.

In the revised European NUTS nomenclature, the regions of Epirus and Western Macedonia together with the two regions of the Decentralized Administration of Macedonia and Thrace form the first level NUTS region EL5 (Voreia Ellada).

Secretary-General
The Decentralized Administration is led by a Secretary-General who is appointed or dismissed by a Cabinet decision upon request of the Greek Minister of Interior, and is therefore considered the senior representative of the national government in the regions.

Following the electoral victory of Syriza in January 2015, the new Minister for the Interior, Nikos Voutsis, declared that the decentralized administrations would be abolished, and their powers transferred to the regions. Until this reform is formalized, and as the Secretaries-General appointed by the previous administration resigned on 2 February, the decentralized administrations are run by their senior civil servants as Acting Secretaries-General.

Current Acting Secretary-General is Vasileios Michelakis.

List of General Secretaries
Since its establishment in 2011, the following General Secretaries have been appointed:
 Dimitra Georgakopoulou-Basta, January 2011 – August 2012
 Ilias Theodoridis, August 2012 – August 2013
 Eftaxa Basiliki, August 2013 – February 2015
 Vasileios Michelakis, since February 2015

References

Literature

External links
  

2011 establishments in Greece
Epirus (region)
Western Macedonia
Epirus